Balu may refer to:

Places 
 Balu, Kaithal, an archeological site near Kaithal, Haryana, India
 Balu, Khuzestan, a village in Khuzestan Province, Iran
 Balu, West Azerbaijan, a village in West Azerbaijan Province, Iran
 Balū, alternate name of Parcheh Balut, a village in Iran
 Balu River, Bangladesh
 Balu (Lotru), a river in Romania

People 
 S. N. Balagangadhara (born 1952), Indian religious philosopher and academic also known as "Balu"
 S. P. Balasubrahmanyam (born 1946), Indian singer sometimes known as "Balu"   
 Balu Mahendra (1939–2014), Tamil filmmaker, screenwriter, editor and cinematographer
 Balu Sankaran (1926–2012), Indian doctor, researcher and academic
 T. R. Baalu (born 1941), Indian politician

Other uses  
 Balu (film), 2005 Telugu film

See also
 Balas (disambiguation)
 Jean Balue (c. 1421–1491), French cardinal and minister of King Louis XI
 Baloo, a main character in The Jungle Book